Dana S. Nau is a Professor of Computer Science and Systems Research at the University of Maryland Department of Computer Science in College Park, where he has done research in automated planning and scheduling, game theory, cognitive science, and computer-aided engineering.  He has many PHD students, including Qiang Yang who graduated in 1989. He has more than 300 publications and several best-paper awards. Some of his accomplishments include the discovery of game tree pathology, the development of the SHOP and SHOP2 HTN planning systems, and the book Automated Planning: Theory and Practice. He is a Fellow of the AAAI.

Honors
1996 – Fellow, AAAI
2013 – Fellow of the Association for Computing Machinery

References

External links 
 Dana Nau's home page

Living people
University of Maryland, College Park faculty
Artificial intelligence researchers
American computer scientists
Duke University alumni
Missouri University of Science and Technology alumni
Fellows of the Association for the Advancement of Artificial Intelligence
Fellows of the Association for Computing Machinery
1951 births